William Locke may refer to:

 William Locke of Norbury 18th-century English patron of the arts, see Joseph Wilton
 William Henry Locke, chaplain and writer during the American Civil War
 William Locke (general) (1894–1962), officer in the Australian Army
 William John Locke (1863–1930), English novelist, born in British Guyana of English parents
 William Locke (baseball), owner of the Philadelphia Phillies in 1913 on List of Philadelphia Phillies owners and executives

See also
William Lock (disambiguation)